Carlos Daniel Small Cardenas (born 13 March 1995) is a Panamanian professional footballer.

International career
Small made his international debut for Panama on February 17, 2016 during a friendly match against El Salvador. He scored his first two international goals in a friendly against Grenada in a 5–0 victory for Panama on October 24, 2017.

Honours
Individual
 CONCACAF League Team of the Tournament: 2017

Career statistics

International

International goals
Scores and results list Panama's goal tally first.

References

External links
 
 

Living people
1995 births
Panamanian footballers
Association football forwards
Sporting San Miguelito players
FC Guria Lanchkhuti players
C.D. Árabe Unido players
Rio Grande Valley FC Toros players
Panama international footballers
2015 CONCACAF U-20 Championship players
Liga Panameña de Fútbol players
USL Championship players